Ladies in Distress is a 1938 American drama film directed by Gus Meins and written by Dorrell McGowan and Stuart E. McGowan. The film stars Alison Skipworth, Polly Moran, Robert Livingston, Virginia Grey, Max Terhune and Berton Churchill. The film was released on June 13, 1938, by Republic Pictures.

Plot

Cast 
Alison Skipworth as Josephine Bonney
Polly Moran as Lydia Bonney
Robert Livingston as Pete Braddock
Virginia Grey as Sally
Max Terhune as Dave Evans
Berton Churchill as Fred Morgan
Leonard Penn as Daniel J. Roman
Horace McMahon as 2nd Thug
Allen Vincent as Spade
Eddie Acuff as Horace 
Charles Anthony Hughes as Lieutenant
Jack Carr as Policeman
Walter Sande as Duncan
Billy Wayne as Brown

References

External links
 

1938 films
American drama films
1938 drama films
Republic Pictures films
Films directed by Gus Meins
American black-and-white films
1930s English-language films
1930s American films